{{Infobox election
| election_name     = 2004 United States Senate election in South Carolina
| country           = South Carolina
| type              = presidential
| ongoing           = no
| previous_election = 1998 United States Senate election in South Carolina
| previous_year     = 1998
| next_election     = 2010 United States Senate election in South Carolina
| next_year         = 2010
| election_date     = November 2, 2004
| image_size        = x150px

| image1            = Jim DeMint headshot.jpg
| nominee1          = Jim DeMint
| party1            = Republican Party (United States)
| popular_vote1     = 857,167
| percentage1       = 53.7%

| image2            = Inez Tenenbaum.jpg
| nominee2          = Inez Tenenbaum
| party2            = Democratic Party (United States)
| popular_vote2     = 704,384
| percentage2       = 44.1%

| map_image = 2004 United States Senate election in South Carolina results map by county.svg
| map_size = 230px
| map_caption = County resultsDeMint:   Tenenbaum:    

| title             = U.S. Senator
| before_election   = Fritz Hollings
| before_party      = Democratic Party (United States)
| after_election    = Jim DeMint
| after_party       = Republican Party (United States)
}}

The 2004 United States Senate election in South Carolina  was held on November 2, 2004. Longtime incumbent Democratic U.S. Senator Fritz Hollings retired, and Republican U.S. Representative Jim DeMint won the open seat. DeMint was the first Republican to hold this Senate seat since Reconstruction.

 Democratic primary 
South Carolina's status as a Republican stronghold led observers to speculate that Hollings retiring would lead to his seat being picked up by a Republican. Inez Tenenbaum, the South Carolina Superintendent of Education, would win the primary by a wide margin following the decision of many state Democrats to forgo a candidacy.

 Candidates 

 Nominee 

 Inez Tenenbaum, South Carolina Superintendent of Education

 Eliminated in primary 
 Ben Frasier, former congressional aide

 Withdrew 

 Bob Coble, mayor of Columbia (endorsed Tenenbaum)

 Declined to run 

 Jim Clyburn, U.S. Representative
 Hayne Hipp, businessman
 Fritz Hollings, incumbent U.S. Senator (retired)
 Darla Moore, investor
 Thomas L. Moore, state senator
 Alex Sanders, former president of the College of Charleston; nominee for U.S. Senate in 2002
 James E. Smith Jr., state representative
 John Spratt, U.S. Representative

 Results 

 Republican primary 

 Candidates 

 Nominee 

 Jim DeMint, U.S. Representative

 Defeated in primary 
 David Beasley, former governor
 Charlie Condon, State Attorney General
 Orly Benny Davis, businesswoman
 Mark McBride, Mayor of Myrtle Beach
 Thomas Ravenel, businessman

 Campaign 
The Senate election two years earlier in 2002 did not have a primary election because the South Carolina Republicans were more preoccupied with the gubernatorial contest, despite having the first open senate seat in 40 years.  The retirement of Democratic Senator Fritz Hollings gave the Republicans an opportunity to pick up the seat and with no other interesting positions up for election in 2004, a crowded field developed in the Republican primary.  Furthermore, the Republicans were motivated by having President Bush at the top of the ticket enabling them to ride his coattails to victory.

Former Governor David Beasley, from the Pee Dee, entered the race and quickly emerged as the frontrunner because of his support from the evangelical voters.  However, during his term as governor from 1994 to 1998 he had greatly angered the electorate by proposing to remove the Confederate Naval Jack from the dome of the statehouse and by being against the adoption of a state lottery to provide for college scholarships. Both positions led to the loss of his re-election in 1998 and the issues continued to trouble him in the Senate race.

The battle for second place in the primary was between Upstate congressman, Jim DeMint, and Charleston developer Thomas Ravenel.  DeMint was able to squeak out a second-place finish because Charlie Condon, a former Attorney General of South Carolina, split the Lowcountry vote with Ravenel thus providing DeMint the margin he needed.  In addition, while many voters were attracted to the Ravenel campaign and felt that he had a future in politics, they believed that he should set his sights on a less high-profile office first before trying to become senator.  Resigned to defeat, Ravenel endorsed DeMint in the runoff election.

In the runoff election on June 22, 2004, DeMint scored a surprising victory over Beasley.  Ravenel's endorsement of DeMint proved crucial as the Lowcountry counties heavily went for the Representative from the Upstate.  Also, Beasley had burnt too many bridges while governor and was unable to increase his share of the vote in the runoff.

 Polling 

 Results 

 General election 

 Candidates 

 Major 
 Jim DeMint (R), U.S. Representative
 Inez Tenenbaum (D), South Carolina Superintendent of Education

 Minor 
 Tee Ferguson (United Citizens)
 Efia Nwangaza (Green)
 Rebekah E. Sutherland (Libertarian)
 Patrick Tyndall (Constitution)

DeMint entered the general election campaign severely weakened from the primary fight, having spent most of his campaign funds.  He stressed to the voters that he would follow conservative principles and provide an important Republican vote in the closely divided Senate.  Democrats fared poorly in statewide elections in South Carolina, so Tenenbaum tried to make the race about issues rather than party identification.  

Tenenbaum attacked DeMint's support of the FairTax proposal because it would increase the sales tax by 23%.  The election victory by DeMint merely cemented South Carolina's shift to the Republican column as the best candidate the Democrats could offer was soundly defeated by the typical 10-point margin.

 Predictions 

 Polling 

 Results 

 
 

 

|-
| 
| colspan=5 |Republican gain''' from Democratic

|-
 | colspan=6|*Nwangaza ran under the Independence Party in Aiken and Calhoun counties; her totals are combined.

|-

See also 
 2004 United States Senate elections
 List of United States senators from South Carolina

References 

 
 

2004 South Carolina elections
2004
South Carolina